Artemi Aleksandrovich Ukomsky (born 29 April 1998) is a Russian football player who plays for FC Spartak Kostroma.

Club career
He made his debut in the Russian Football National League for FC Dynamo Bryansk on 1 August 2020 in a game against FC Orenburg, he substituted Vladislav Drogunov at half-time.

References

External links
 
 Profile by Russian Football National League
 

1998 births
Sportspeople from Moscow Oblast
People from Korolyov, Moscow Oblast
Living people
Russian footballers
Association football forwards
FC Dynamo Bryansk players
FC Olimp-Dolgoprudny players
FC Spartak Kostroma players
Russian First League players
Russian Second League players